Dominik Rodinger (born 7 August 1986) is a Czech former professional footballer who played as a goalkeeper. He played in the Czech Gambrinus liga for FK Bohemians Praha. He also competed in the Corgoň liga for Slovan Bratislava and Dukla Banská Bystrica.

References

External links

1987 births
Living people
Czech footballers
Footballers from Prague
Association football goalkeepers
Czech Republic under-21 international footballers
Slovak Super Liga players
2. Liga (Slovakia) players
Bohemians 1905 players
FK Bohemians Prague (Střížkov) players
ŠK Slovan Bratislava players
MFK Zemplín Michalovce players
CD Badajoz players
FK Dukla Banská Bystrica players
Czech expatriate footballers
Czech expatriate sportspeople in Slovakia
Expatriate footballers in Slovakia
Czech expatriate sportspeople in Spain
Expatriate footballers in Spain